Meramec is a name for several places in the United States:
 Meramec River in Missouri
 Meramec Caverns on the Meramec River
 Meramec State Park in Missouri

See also
 Merrimac (disambiguation)
 Merrimack (disambiguation)
 Meramec (series)
 Meramec Township (disambiguation)